Nikhila Orissa Beedi Shramika Federation (All Orissa Beedi Workers Federation), a trade union in Odisha, India, organizing women beedi workers. NOBSF is affiliated to the All India Trade Union Congress.

Trade unions in India
All India Trade Union Congress